Vandières may refer to the following places in France:

 Vandières, Marne, a commune in the Marne department
 Vandières, Meurthe-et-Moselle, a commune in the Meurthe-et-Moselle department